Vojnův Městec is a market town in Žďár nad Sázavou District in the Vysočina Region of the Czech Republic. It has about 800 inhabitants.

Administrative parts
The hamlet of Nová Huť is an administrative part of Vojnův Městec.

Notable people
Jaroslav Jiřík (1939–2011), ice hockey player

References

Populated places in Žďár nad Sázavou District
Market towns in the Czech Republic